GAMAGO is a company that was founded in 2001 by Greg Long and Chris Edmundson. The pair began silkscreening t-shirts with artwork from their friends in Long’s San Francisco garage. They wanted to help promote the San Francisco art scene and distract from their day jobs.  Shortly after starting, one of Long’s friends, artist Tim Biskup joined them, and printed shirts with Biskup’s Gama-Goon character.  The three of them together took the basement hobby and turned it into a company.  In 2006, Tim Biskup ceased his creative involvement with the company.

In 2006, GAMAGO shifted their focus from apparel to gifts for the home and kitchen.  2009 saw the release of The Flipper, a guitar shaped spatula.  The success of The Flipper helped to cement GAMAGO's name among the top gift-ware design companies.  GAMAGO products are available in 3000+ stores internationally.   

In June 2017 the company was acquired by NMR America and Greg Long exited. He next co-founded the consumer cannabis brand, Murmmr. Chris Edmundson remains the Creative Director of the GAMAGO brand.

References

News articles 
 http://www.sfgate.com/cgi-bin/article.cgi?f=/c/a/2005/01/02/LVGTEAGKJL1.DTL
 http://www.sfgate.com/cgi-bin/article.cgi?f=/c/a/2007/02/17/HOGGVO3BTF1.DTL&hw=gama+go&sn=001&sc=1000
 http://www.sfbg.com/39/19/x_biznews.html
 http://www.yelp.com/biz/r5ihEXPbdpufk_7dqYlhmA

External links
 GAMAGO official site

Manufacturing companies based in California
Companies based in San Francisco
Companies established in 2001